Saint-Paul-de-Fenouillet (Languedocien: Sant Pau de Fenolhet) is a commune in the Pyrénées-Orientales department in southern France.

Geography 
Saint-Paul-de-Fenouillet is located in the canton of La Vallée de l'Agly and in the arrondissement of Perpignan.

Government and politics

Mayors

International relations 
Saint-Paul-de-Fenouillet is twinned with the town of Ennis in the Republic of Ireland.

Population

Sites of interest 
 The church of the chapter of Saint-Paul, built between the 14th and 17th centuries and protected as a monument historique since 1989.
 The Saint-Antoine de Galamus hermitage, built in the 15th century, and described in 1821 by Joseph Antoine Cervini and Antoine Ignace Melling as the « most beautiful wonder of Roussillon ».

Coat of arms 

It is said that the Coat of Arms has a relationship with Jean Lannes, 1st Duc de Montebello, 1st Prince de Siewierz (10 April 1769 – 31 May 1809) and Marshal of the Empire whose coat of arms has the sword pointing up, in recognition for his relationship with Marie Antoinette and Marius Fenouillet during the First Empire.

Notable people
 Renada-Laura Portet (1927-2021), writer and linguist

See also
 Corbières Massif
 Fenolheda
Communes of the Pyrénées-Orientales department

References

Communes of Pyrénées-Orientales
Fenouillèdes